The January 2018 Benghazi bombing was an attack with two car bombs on the Bayaat al-Radwan mosque in Benghazi, Libya.

Attack 

The first car bomb exploded outside of the mosque, the second bomb detonated 15 minutes later as firefighters and security forces had responded to the first explosion.
A total of 41 people died and 80 others were wounded in the attacks. According to the Libya Observer, the mosque was attended by security forces; one official was reportedly killed in the bomb attack. An Egyptian national was killed. The twin explosions shattered the relative calm that had returned to Libya’s second city, scene of more than three years of warfare.

Responsibility 
No group claimed responsibility for the bombing.

See also 
Libyan Civil War (2014–present)
List of terrorist incidents in 2018
February 2018 Benghazi bombing

References 

2018 in Libya
History of Benghazi
Mass murder in 2018
Terrorist incidents in Libya in 2018
January 2018 crimes in Africa
2018 murders in Libya
Car bombs
Attacks in Africa in 2018
Attacks in Libya